Phil Hart is a Republican  Idaho Legislature District 2 State Senate candidate. He is a successful Kootenai and Shoshone County businessman. Hart stopped filing both federal and state income tax returns in 1996 while he unsuccessfully pressed a federal lawsuit challenging the federal income tax as unconstitutional. After the case was rejected, he began filing returns again, but authorities said he never fully paid up. He’s also been fighting an order to pay more than $53,000 in back state income taxes; the federal settlement doesn’t cover the state taxes. Phil Hart was a Republican Idaho State Representative from 2004 to 2012 representing District 3 in the B seat.

Education
Hart earned his bachelor's degree in civil engineering from the University of Utah and his MBA from the Wharton School of the University of Pennsylvania.

Elections
2018

Hart was defeated by incumbent Paul Shepherd in the Republican primary taking 41.3% of the vote.

2012

Redistricted to 2B, Hart lost the four-way May 15, 2012, Republican primary to Ed Morse, getting only 31.2% of the vote.

2010

Hart was unopposed for the Republican Primary.

Hart won the general election with 80.1% of the vote against write-in candidate Howard Griffiths.

2008

Hart won the Republican primary with 2,714 votes against David Rawls

Hart was unopposed for the general election votes.

2006

Hart won the Republican primary with 57% of the vote, again against Wayne R. Meyer.

Hart was unopposed for the general election.

2004

Hart challenged Wayne R. Meyer in the May 25, 2004, Republican primary, winning with 60.25% of the vote.

Hart won the general election by defeating Wayne R. Meyer again this time as a write-in candidate, with 91% of the vote.

2002

When Republican Representative Kris Ellis was re-districted to District 4, Hart ran as the Constitution Party nominee, but lost the November 5, 2002, general election to Republican Wayne R. Meyer only getting 31.7% of the vote.

References

External links
 

Year of birth missing (living people)
Place of birth missing (living people)
Living people
Republican Party members of the Idaho House of Representatives
People from Shoshone County, Idaho
University of Utah alumni
Wharton School of the University of Pennsylvania alumni